The Yalë language, also known as Nagatman, is spoken in northwestern Papua New Guinea. It may be related to the Kwomtari languages, but Palmer (2018) classifies it as a language isolate.

There were 600 speakers in 1991 and 30 monolinguals at an unrecorded date. Yalë is spoken in Nagatiman and several other villages of Green River Rural LLG in Sandaun Province. Foley (2018) reports a total of six villages.

Yalë is in extensive trade and contact with Busa, a likely language isolate spoken just to the south. Yalë has complex verbal inflection and SOV word order.

Pronouns
Pronouns are:

{| 
!  !! sg !! pl
|-
! 1
| bo || se ~ sebo
|-
! 2
| ju || so ~ sobo
|-
! 3
| colspan="2" style="text-align: center;" | bu
|}

Grammar
Verbal conjugation affixes are:
-d: generic marker
-t: transitive marker
-b: intransitive marker

Most nouns are not pluralized, and only nouns with human or animate reference or with high local salience may be pluralized using the suffix -rɛ ~ -re:
nɛba-re /child-PL/ ‘children’
ama-re /dog-PL/ ‘dogs’
dife-rɛ /village-PL/ ‘villages’

Other plural nouns are irregular:
aya-nino /father-PL/ ‘fathers’
mise ‘woman’, one ‘women’

Vocabulary
The following basic vocabulary words are from Conrad and Dye (1975), as cited in the Trans-New Guinea database:

{| class="wikitable sortable"
! gloss !! Yadë
|-
| head || ʌsu
|-
| hair || ʌsʌǏahuᵽa
|-
| ear || ąhuǏuʔ
|-
| eye || na:ba
|-
| nose || yɛlu
|-
| tongue || aǏižiʔ
|-
| louse || mibaʔ
|-
| dog || kaliʔ
|-
| pig || gǏɛǏiʔ
|-
| bird || pʋlɛʔ
|-
| egg || kah
|-
| blood || wi:nuʔ
|-
| bone || ɛlɛ:b̶u
|-
| skin || žib̶uʔ
|-
| breast || ma:ba
|-
| tree || ti:
|-
| woman || mɩsɛʔ
|-
| water || tuʔ
|-
| fire || ahuz̨iʔ
|-
| stone || anɩziʔ
|-
| road, path || ařʌgɛʔ
|-
| eat || hiɛǏɛ
|-
| one || žuwaʔ
|-
| two || teǏɛʔ
|}

Further reading
Campbell, Carl and Jody Campbell. 1987. Yadë Grammar Essentials. Unpublished manuscript. Ukarumpa, PNG: Summer Institute of Linguistics.
Campbell, Carl and Jody Campbell. 1990. Yadë (Nagatman) – English Dictionary. Unpublished manuscript. Ukarumpa, PNG: Summer Institute of Linguistics.
Campbell, Carl and Jody Campbell. 1997. Yalë (Nagatman, Yadë) Phonology Essentials. Unpublished manuscript. Ukarumpa, PNG: Summer Institute of Linguistics.

References

External links 
Nagatiman language word list at TransNewGuinea.org
Paradisec has an open access collection that includes Yalë language materials from Don Laycock

Languages of Sandaun Province
Guriaso–Yale languages
Language isolates of New Guinea